Rodrigo Fernando Basualdo (born 12 March 1993) is an Argentine professional footballer who plays as a midfielder for Argentino de Merlo.

Career
Deportivo Morón gave Basualdo his start in senior football, with manager Mario Grana selecting him for his professional debut on 12 April 2013 versus Central Córdoba in Primera B Metropolitana. Further appearances against Almagro, Atlanta, Temperley and Comunicaciones arrived in the 2012–13 campaign. In 2015, after nine more games for the club, Basualdo departed on loan to Primera C Metropolitana's Ferrocarril Midland. One goal in thirty-five fixtures followed. Deportivo Morón won the league title alongside promotion to Primera B Nacional in 2016–17, though the midfielder didn't play a single minute.

On 8 August 2017, Basualdo signed for Defensores Unidos of Primera C Metropolitana. He participated in twenty-seven fixtures in his first season, which concluded with promotion as division champions to Primera B Metropolitana. His first appearance at that level for the club arrived in August versus UAI Urquiza.

Career statistics
.

Honours
Defensores Unidos
Primera C Metropolitana: 2017–18

References

External links

1993 births
Living people
Sportspeople from Buenos Aires Province
Argentine footballers
Association football midfielders
Primera B Metropolitana players
Primera C Metropolitana players
Deportivo Morón footballers
Club Ferrocarril Midland players
Defensores Unidos footballers
Argentino de Merlo footballers